Capital punishment is abolished in Argentina. Argentina abolished capital punishment for ordinary crimes in 1984 and abolished it for all crimes in 2008. Argentina voted in favor of the United Nations moratorium on the death penalty eight times, in 2007, 2008, 2010, 2012, 2014, 2016, 2018, and 2020. Argentina signed the Second Optional Protocol to the International Covenant on Civil and Political Rights on 20 Dec 2006 and ratified it on 2 Sep 2008.

History 
Argentina reinstated and abolished the death penalty several times between 1922 and its final abolition (for ordinary crimes) in 1984.

References

Argentina
Law of Argentina